Bill O'Connor may refer to:

Bill O'Connor (American football), American football end, active 1948–1953
Bill O'Connor (Australian footballer) (1908–1989), Australian rules footballer for South Melbourne
Bill O'Connor (basketball), American basketball coach
Bill O'Connor (comics), comics writer, see Atom
Bill O'Connor (mountaineer and writer), see Cholatse
Bill O'Connor (musician), country music performer at National Barn Dance
Bill O'Connor (racing driver), see Camping World Grand Prix at The Glen and 1983 Formula Atlantic season
Bill O'Connor (ice hockey), see 2006 World Junior A Challenge

See also
Billy O'Connor, musician
William O'Connor (disambiguation)